"Rhythm Bandits" is a song by Danish band Junior Senior. It was released as the second single from their 2002 debut album, D-D-Don't Don't Stop the Beat, on 28 July 2003 but failed to match the success of previous single "Move Your Feet". Although the song did chart, peaking at number 22 in the United Kingdom and number 47 in Australia and Ireland, it was the last charting song for Junior Senior, whose album Hey Hey My My Yo Yo was not released in the UK, a fact that angered the group's fanbase.

Charts

Release history

References

2002 songs
2003 singles
Epic Records singles
Junior Senior songs
Mercury Records singles